Texicanas is an American reality television series that premiered May 7, 2019 and airs on Bravo. The show follows a group of women with Mexican heritage living in San Antonio, Texas.

Cast
 Penny Ayarzagoitia 
 Mayra Farret
 Lorena Martinez
 Anayancy Nolasco
 Karla Ramirez
 Luz Ortiz

Episodes

References

External links
 
 Texicanas at IMDb

2010s American reality television series
2019 American television series debuts
Bravo (American TV network) original programming
History of women in Texas
Mexican-American culture in San Antonio